Arthur Julian (March 7, 1923 – January 30, 1995) was an American actor, producer and television writer.

Some of Julian's production credits include the television shows Vacation Playhouse, Gimme a Break!, and Amen. Julian also served on the writing staff of the television shows Meet Millie,  F Troop, Bewitched, Hogan's Heroes, and The Doris Day Show.

Filmography

 How to Stuff a Wild Bikini (1965) (Dr. Melamed)
 Bewitched (1966-1968; 5 episodes)
 F Troop (episode 2.15: "Survival of the Fittest", December 15, 1966) (The Undertaker)
 The Flying Nun (episode 1.11: "It's an Ill Wind", November 16, 1967) (Moon)
 That Girl (1968-1969; 4 episodes)

Producer

 Vacation Playhouse (1963-1966)
 Love Thy Neighbor (1973)
 Gimme a Break! (1983-1987; 96 episodes)
 Amen (1987-1990; 65 episodes)

Writer

 Meet Millie (1952-1956; 10 episodes)
 Ford Theatre (1955; 1 episode)
 Schlitz Playhouse of Stars (1957; 1 episode)
 The Happy Road (1957)
 December Bride (1957-1959; 7 episodes)
 The Real McCoys (1958; 1 episode)
 NBC Sunday Showcase (1959; 1 episode)
 Guestward, Ho! (1960-1961; 3 episodes)
 Glynis (1963; 2 episodes)
 The Baileys of Balboa (1964; 1 episode)
 Vacation Playhouse (1966; 1 episode)
 F Troop (1965-1967; 30 episodes)
 Hogan's Heroes (1965-1971; 30 episodes)
 I Dream of Jeannie (1968; 1 episode)
 That Girl (1968; 3 episodes)
 Bewitched (1968; 1 episode)
 The Flying Nun (1968-1969; 3 episodes)
 The Queen & I (1969; 5 episodes)
 The Boatniks (1970)
 The Carol Burnett Show (1970-1971; 25 episodes)
 The Chicago Teddy Bears (1971; 2 episodes)
 The Odd Couple (1971; 2 episodes)
 Don Rickles: Alive and Kicking (1972; TV movie)
 Temperatures Rising (1973; 2 episodes)
 The Doris Day Show (1973; 16 episodes)
 Love Thy Neighbor (1973; all episodes)
 Wait Till Your Father Gets Home (1973; 1 episode)
 Happy Anniversary and Goodbye (1974; TV movie)
 M*A*S*H (1975; 1 episode)
 The Rear Guard (1976 pilot episode)
 Maude (1976-1978; 17 episodes)
 Apple Pie (1978; 2 episodes)
 The Wonderful World of Disney (1978; 1 episode)
 Hanging In (1979; 2 episodes)
 The Two of Us (1981; 6 episodes)
 Love, Sidney (1983; 2 episodes)
 At Ease (1983; 5 episodes)
 Gimme a Break! (1983-1987; 33 episodes)
 Mr. President (1987; 1 episode)
 Amen'' (1987-1990; 23 episodes)

References

External links

1923 births
1995 deaths
Writers from Memphis, Tennessee
American television writers
American male television writers
American male television actors
20th-century American male actors
Male actors from Memphis, Tennessee
Screenwriters from Tennessee
20th-century American screenwriters
20th-century American male writers